Pavlodar Central Stadium (Ortalyq stadıon) is a multi-purpose stadium in Pavlodar, Kazakhstan. The former name of the stadium was "Traktor". It is currently used mostly for football matches and is the home stadium of FC Irtysh.

History
The football arena has been in use since 1947. "Central" was refurbished in 2001, 2007 and 2015.

In the 2007–2008 season, the outdated scoreboard was replaced with a new LCD monitor, with the ability to display match moments and reports from other games. Since the 2009–2010 season, the Irtysh team has had a heated playing field on which to train. The stadium has met UEFA standards since the construction work.

Reconstruction
During the reconstruction the following works were carried out:

In the year 2001:
 Construction of parking spaces 
 Extension of crew changing rooms and a conference room
 Large scale renovation of the football pitch
 Reconstruction of the lawn irrigation system 
 Restoration of the six light poles 
 Refurbishment of public toilets

In the year 2007:
 Replacement of natural grass with an artificial turf with drainage system from the Netherlands
 Construction of a small stadium 
 Reconstruction of the west, north and east stands according to UEFA standards.
 Renovation of the VIP lounge 
 Paving of running tracks

The stadium has a pitch of 105×68 metres and a capacity of 11,828 spectators.

Images

References

 

Football venues in Kazakhstan
Multi-purpose stadiums in Kazakhstan